Huang Jun (1890–1937), Courtesy name Qiuyue(), Art name Huangsuirensheng An() was a Chinese man of letters, author and spy.  He was well known for his collection of late Qing dynasty anecdotes "Huasuirensheng An Zhiyi"().

Huang was born in a prestigious family from Fuzhou. His father Huang Yanhong was a Juren. After the cession of Taiwan to Japan, his family moved to Beijing. In the age of 17, Huang Jun graduated from imperial university of Peking(Later known as Peking University) and obtained the degree of Juren. Later, Huang studied at Waseda University in Japan.

In August 1932, he was appointed the secretary of Executive Yuan. In 1935, with the recommendation of Lin Sen, Huang started to participate in the confidential meetings of the government of Republic of China.

At the early stage of World War II, Huang became a spy working for the Japanese intelligence agency. He sold valuable information to the Japanese government which led to the failure of Chiang Kai-shek's plan of preventing the Japanese army from marching southward.

All the evidences found by investigator Gu Zhenglun pointed to Huang Jun. In August 1937, Huang was convicted of treason and executed along with his son Huang Sheng and others who helped him retrieving confidential information.

Huang's collection of anecdotes "Huasuirensheng An Zhiyi" was regarded as both credible and valuable account of late Qing dynasty history. Fang Zhaoying, a historian, had given Huang's book much appreciation. Chen Yinke went as far as sympathizing Huang's death after reading his literary works and poems.

References 

1890 births
1937 deaths
Republic of China politicians from Fujian
Waseda University alumni
People executed by the Republic of China
Executed spies
Japanese spies
Executed Republic of China people
Executed people from Fujian
Politicians from Fuzhou
Historians from Fujian
Writers from Fuzhou
Republic of China historians